Fådalen (or historically spelled Faadalen) is a valley and village area in Tynset Municipality in Innlandet county, Norway. The village of Fåset lies at the southern end of the valley where the river Fåa flows into the large river Glåma. The village of Savalen and the lake Savalen both lie at the northwest end of the valley.

Name
The first element is the river name  and the last element is the finite form of the Norwegian word  which means 'dale' or 'valley'. Hence the meaning is the "Fåa river valley".

References

Tynset
Villages in Innlandet
Valleys of Innlandet